Bhawani Singh Rajawat (born 5 September 1955, Hanotia) is a Bharatiya Janata Party politician from the Indian state of Rajasthan. He won the 2013 Rajasthan Legislative Assembly election from Ladpura Constituency of Kota district. He had also won the previous elections of 2008. He was suspended for a year in 2011 after hurling a shoe at the Indian National Congress MLA Raghu Sharma in the state Assembly.

References

1955 births
Living people
Bharatiya Janata Party politicians from Rajasthan
Rajasthani politicians
Anti-Bihari sentiment
Rajasthan MLAs 2013–2018